Yaqueisi Alexandra Núñez Soriano (born 19 April 1994) is a Dominican footballer who plays for WPSL team Treasure Coast Dynamites as a forward.

References

External links 
 

1994 births
Living people
Women's association football forwards
Dominican Republic women's footballers
Sportspeople from San Pedro de Macorís
Dominican Republic women's international footballers
Competitors at the 2014 Central American and Caribbean Games
Women's Premier Soccer League Elite players
Dominican Republic expatriate women's footballers
Dominican Republic expatriate sportspeople in the United States
Expatriate women's soccer players in the United States